Sonowal may refer to:
Sonowal Kacharis, an ethnic group in Assam
Sonowal khel, an artisan class of medieval Assam
Jitul Sonowal, singer of Assam
Jyotsna Sonowal, Indian politician
Lohit Sonowal, Commando Battalion of Assam Police
Naren Sonowal, Indian politician
Sarbananda Sonowal, Indian politician